Edgar William John Montford (25 April 1865 – 1940) was a Welsh footballer who played for Stoke in the Football League.

Football career
Montford was signed from Welsh side Newtown in 1885 he played in eight competitive games for Stoke with five of them coming in the Football League. He left Stoke in 1890 to play for Leek. Edgar also had a brother, Harry Montford who also played for Stoke.

Professional baseball
In 1890 Montford played professional baseball for Stoke in the National League of Baseball of Great Britain.

Career statistics

References

Stoke City F.C. players
English Football League players
Welsh footballers
1940 deaths
1865 births
Association football fullbacks
Newtown A.F.C. players
Leek F.C. players
Welsh baseball players